Byron Efraín Palacios Vélez (Alhajuela, Portoviejo, Manabí, Ecuador; February 20, 1995) is an Ecuadorian footballer who plays as a midfielder or forward and his current team is El Nacional from Ecuadorian Serie B.

Club career 
He started as a footballer in Colón F.C when he played in Ecuadorian Serie B, with which in the 2015 season he played 16 games and scored 4 goals.

In 2016 he arrived at Rocafuerte FC of the Second Category of Ecuador (a subsidiary of CS Emelec) at the request of coach Javier Klimowicz, and due to his good performances he had with the team, the following year he became part of the Emelec reserves of Ecuadorian Serie A, where he manages to score several goals, including a triplet scored against Barcelona S.C. in a classic from Reserve Shipyard, which made the head coach at that time Mariano Soso summon him to the first team.

His debut with the main squad in Serie A was on October 21, 2018, in the game that his team faced Mácara, where he scored his first goal, which was the fastest of his career taking only 33 seconds in the field of play, that meeting ended with a score of 3 to 1 in favor of the electric team, a result that was useful for him to play the final of that season against the L.D.U. Quito where he managed to play the second leg at the Stadium Rodrigo Paz Delgado, coming out runner-up.

In June 2019 he was loaned to El Nacional until the end of the season. He played his first match with the military jersey for the first day of the second stage of the 2019 Ecuadorian championship where his team won 1 to 0 to Barcelona SC. His first goal with the puros criollos shirt marked him on date 8 of Serie A 2020 against the C.D. Olmedo, in the triumph of his team by 3 to 2.

References

External links
 

1995 births
Living people
Ecuadorian Serie A players
Ecuadorian Serie B players
Ecuadorian footballers
Association football midfielders
C.S. Emelec footballers
C.D. El Nacional footballers